Sally-Jane Spencer (born 10 July 1948, Buckinghamshire) is an English actress best known for playing Linda Patterson in the BBC television sitcom The Fall and Rise of Reginald Perrin (1976–79) and its sequel The Legacy of Reginald Perrin (1996). She appeared in the 1966 film The Great St Trinian's Train Robbery and the Bette Davis film The Anniversary (1968). She made her debut performance on the West End stage in The Prime Of Miss Jean Brodie.

References

External links
 

1948 births
English television actresses
English stage actresses
Living people